Kingsley is a civil parish in Cheshire West and Chester, England. Other than the village of Kingsley, the parish is entirely rural. It contains 13 buildings that are recorded in the National Heritage List for England as designated listed buildings. Other than the church and its lychgate, and the wall of a former Quaker burial ground, the structures are all related to domestic buildings or farms.

Key

Buildings

See also
 Listed buildings in Aston-by-Sutton
 Listed buildings in Crowton
 Listed buildings in Frodsham
 Listed buildings in Manley
 Listed buildings in Norley

References
Citations

Sources

Listed buildings in Cheshire West and Chester
Lists of listed buildings in Cheshire